Reine Feldt (1945–1986) was a Swedish footballer and journalist that played football for Utsiktens BK and IFK Göteborg.

Career
Felt started his senior career in Utsiktens BK and joined IFK Göteborg in 1965. He made a total of 355 senior appearances for IFK Göteborg and was the captain of the Allsvenskan winning team of 1969.

He ended his career in 1975.

Personal life
Feldt also worked as a journalist at Arbetet.

Feldt was secretly homosexual and died of AIDS in 1986 as one of the first victims in Sweden.

Honours

Club 

 IFK Göteborg
 Allsvenskan (1): 1969

Individual 
 Årets ärkeängel (1): 1973

References

Swedish footballers
IFK Göteborg players
Utsiktens BK players
Allsvenskan players
AIDS-related deaths in Sweden
1945 births
1986 deaths
Association football defenders
LGBT association football players
Swedish LGBT sportspeople
Gay sportsmen
20th-century Swedish LGBT people